Mount Simon is a mountain on East Falkland, Falkland Islands. It is south of Teal Inlet and north of Mount Wickham.

References

Simon